OFC may refer to:

Business and financial
 Corporate Office Properties Trust, its NYSE ticker symbol
 Offshore Financial Centre, a term synonymous with a tax haven
 Conduit and Sink OFCs, a categorisation of offshore financial centres/tax havens
 Optional federal charter, a proposal to streamline and simplify US insurance regulation
 Ottawa Folklore Centre, a former instrument and music store in Ottawa, Canada

Media and entertainment
 Online Film Critics Society
 Open-face Chinese poker, a Chinese poker variant
 Order from Chaos, a band

Sport
 Oceania Football Confederation
 Kickers Offenbach, a German association football club
 Odisha FC, an Indian professional football club
 OFC Oostzaan, a Dutch association football club
 Orpington F.C., an English non-league football club

Science and technology
 Osteitis fibrosa cystica, a skeletal disease involving the parathyroid glands
 Open fiber control, a telecommunication protocol
 Optical fiber, conductive, a type of optical fiber cable
 Orbitofrontal cortex, a region of the brain involved in decision making and other cognitive functions
 Oxygen-free copper, a copper cable manufacturing process
 Oxy-fuel cutting, a metal cutting process; See Oxy-fuel welding and cutting
 Open Financial Connectivity, a financial transition file format
 Occipitofrontal circumference, a way to measure the fetal head

Other uses
 ofc, an SMS language abbreviation for "of course"
 Schenley OFC Whisky, a whisky brand
 Daihatsu OFC-1, car brand